WCRT (1160 AM) is a Class B AM radio station licensed to the community of Donelson, Tennessee, near Nashville.  Broadcasting a format of evangelical preaching and talk shows, WCRT is owned by Bott Communications, a Christian broadcaster, which bought the station, formerly WAMB, from longtime Nashville broadcaster Bill Barry (now deceased; he later operated a lower-powered WAMB on the frequency of 1200 kHz).

WCRT broadcasts with 50,000 watts during the day and 1,000 watts at night. Because the 1160 kHz frequency receives interference from a Cuban radio station operating in excess of the officially notified power under international treaties, WCRT maintained a special temporary authority since 1990 from the Federal Communications Commission to operate an FM station at night as well. This station had the call sign WCRT-FM1 and, from 1998 on, operated from one of the WCRT (AM) towers. The last frequency for WCRT-FM1 is 106.3 MHz, the fourth frequency on which it operated since being authorized; the station was required to cease operations when a license was issued for a low-power station on the frequency, WXNS-LP. It has since been replaced by a normal translator, W296DE (107.1 FM).

1160 AM is a United States clear-channel frequency, on which KSL (AM) in Salt Lake City, Utah is the dominant Class A station.  WCRT must reduce power during nighttime hours in order to protect the skywave signals of KSL (AM) and WYLL in Chicago, both fulltime 50,000 watts signals.  WYLL is a Class B station.

See also
List of Nashville media

References

External links
 Bott Radio Network Station Info — official information page

CRT
CRT
Radio stations established in 1968
Bott Radio Network stations